Ezequiel Martín Mechoso Reyes (born 23 March 2000) is a Uruguayan professional footballer who plays as a midfielder for Uruguayan Segunda División club Racing Montevideo.

Club career
A former youth academy player of Defensor Sporting, Mechoso joined Peñarol in October 2018 on a three-year deal. He made his professional debut for the club on 25 March 2021 in a 2–0 league win against Progreso.

International career
Mechoso is a former Uruguay youth international. He was part of national youth team squads at 2015 South American U-15 Championship and 2017 South American U-17 Championship.

Career statistics

Club

References

External links
 

2000 births
Living people
Footballers from Montevideo
Association football midfielders
Uruguayan footballers
Uruguay youth international footballers
Uruguayan Primera División players
Peñarol players